Alona Kimhi (born 1963) is an Israeli award-winning author and former actress.

Biography 
Alona Kimhi was born in Lviv, Ukraine (then in the Soviet Union), in 1966 and emigrated to Israel with her family in 1972.

Following her army service, in a Kibbutz in the Negev Desert, she moved to Tel-Aviv and studied acting at the Beit Zvi Academy of Dramatic Arts, which she graduated with honors and began her career as a Film and Theatre actress. Alona starred in several Israeli and international films, including “Himmo, King of Jerusalem”, “Abba Ganuv”, and "Tobe Hooper’s Night Terrors", as well as playing leading roles in plays by Shakespeare, Arthur Miller and Tennessee Williams.

In the late 1980s, Kimhi started writing lyrics to songs by her spouse, Israeli musician Izhar Ashdot, writing articles for major magazines and began writing short stories.

Her first collection of short stories won the 1994 anonymous ACUM literary contest and the resulting book I Anastasia was published a year later to critical acclaim and became a national bestseller, winning the Israeli Copyright Society prestigious Book of the Year Award.

By the late 1990s, Kimhi became a full-time writer. Her second book and first novel, Weeping Susannah, published in 1998, turned her into a major voice of her generation and started her international career. Weeping Susannah won the 1999 Bernstein award for best novel and the French WIZO award. It has since been translated to 16 languages, published in major international publishing houses, such as Gallimard in France where she is a well known author.

In 2009, her novel Weeping Susanna was dramatized as a miniseries for the Israeli cable TV channel Hot 3.

Alona Kimhi lives in Tel Aviv with her spouse Izhar Ashdot and their son Ilai, writing novels, plays and screenplays for Film and TV.

Awards 
 In 1996, Kimhi was awarded the ACUM Book of the Year Prize for I, Anastasia.
 In 1999, she was the joint recipient of the Bernstein Prize (original Hebrew noval category), for her first novel, Weeping Susannah. The other prize recipient was Yocheved Reisman.
 In 2001, she received the French WIZO Prize.
 In 2001, she was awarded the Prime Minister's Prize.

Published works

Books published in Hebrew
 I, Anastasia (stories), Keter, 1996 [Ani, Anastasia]
  (novel), Keter, 1999 [Susannah Ha-Bochiah]
 Lily La Tigresse (novel), Keter, 2004 [Lily La Tigresse]
 Victor and Masha (novel), Keter, 2012

Children
 Superbabe and the Enchanted Circle Jerusalem, Keter, 2001 [Mushlemet Ve Ha-Maagal Ha-Mechushaf]

Books in translation
I, Anastasia
English: London/New York, Toby Press, 2000 
German: in paperback: Berlin, Berlin Verlag, 2005 
French: Paris, Gallimard, 2008
 Weeping Susannah
Dutch: Amsterdam, Meulenhoff, 2001 
French: Paris, Gallimard, 2001; in paperback: Gallimard/Folio, 2003 
English: London, Harvill, 2001; New York, Harvill/Farrar Straus, 2002,  
Italian: Milan, Rizzoli, 2001 
Swedish: Stockholm, Wahlstrom/Widstrand, 2001 
Portuguese: Lisbon, Asa, 2002 
Finnish: Helsinki, Tammi, 2003 
Greek: Athens, Psichogios, 2002 
German: Munich, Carl Hanser, 2002; in paperback: Berlin, Berlin Verlag, 2004 
Spanish: Barcelona, Galaxia Gutenberg, 2004 
Polish: Warsaw, WAB, 2006 
Chinese: Hefei, Anhui Literature & Art Pubs, 2008 
Turkish: Istanbul, Aclik Defter, 2011 
Czech: Prague, Garamond Press, 2014 
 Lily La Tigresse
English: USA, Dalkey Archive Press, 2014 
German: Munich, Carl Hanser, 2006; pback: Berlin, Berlin Verlag, forthcoming 
French: Paris, Gallimard, 2006; in paperback: Folio, 2007 
Portuguese: Porto, Asa, 2009 
Italian: Milan, Ugo Guanda, 2007
 Victor and Masha 
French: Paris, Gallimard, 2012
 Lunar Eclipse
English:  Translator Yael Lotan, Toby Press, 2001

References

Sources
 Alona Kimhi at the Institute of the Translation of Hebrew Literature

1966 births
Living people
Beit Zvi School for the Performing Arts alumni
Israeli children's writers
Israeli women children's writers
20th-century Israeli women writers
21st-century Israeli women writers
Israeli novelists
Israeli stage actresses
Israeli film actresses
Ukrainian Jews
Ukrainian emigrants to Israel
Israeli people of Ukrainian-Jewish descent
Hebrew-language writers
Bernstein Prize recipients
Recipients of Prime Minister's Prize for Hebrew Literary Works